The Truku War, is series of events happened between May and August 1914, involving the Truku indigenous group uprising against colonial Japanese forces in Japanese Taiwan.

The conflict's main scope was to dominate the area around the area today known as Hualien County, until then controlled by the Truku people.  Since the beginning of the Japanese Occupation of Taiwan in 1895, the Truku Tribe was seen as a major target in that area and for many years before the capitulation Sakuma Samata.  The Governor-General of Taiwan employed massive resources in order to contain and overpower the resistance of Truku warriors, mobilizing as many as 20,000 soldiers and police officers in the field against a population of about 2,000 aboriginals. During a battle, Sakuma Samata was seriously injured but in the second half of August 1914, the Japanese declared victory over the Truku and on August 28, the Governor-General of Taiwan declared the end of the war.

Background
In 1896, due to the rising anger of the Truku people, Japanese Second Lieutenant Yuuki and his 21 subordinates were ambushed and killed in Xincheng, Hualien. This episode is known as the Xincheng Incident. In 1906, the Weili Incident resulted in the death of 36 people among Japanese merchants and in the Hualien Administrative Division due to the dispute of the Truku people over the Japanese monopoly production of natural camphor.

Governor-General of Taiwan Sakuma Samata's ultimate goal was to attack the Truku tribe and to take control of the mountainous area in Hualien to exploit the natural resources such as minerals and wood. In 1913, the Governor-General of Taiwan gave orders to the relative divisions to evaluate and assess the number of the local population in the Hualien/Taroko area. The Truku people resided in eastern Taiwan and were pretty much isolated by natural barriers such as rivers, cliffs and the coastline. There were 15 villages in Btulan area, 33 villages in outer Taroko area and 46 villages in inner Taroko area with total population of around 15,000 people. About 5,000 of the was able to join the war. It is estimated that the local aboriginals were equipped with more than 2,000 modern weapons like Mauser, Murata rifle, Winchester rifle, and Matchlock with about 50,000 rounds of ammunition.

War 
Sakuma Samata, at that time Governor-General of Taiwan, employed massive resources in order to contain and overpower the resistance of Truku warriors mobilizing as many as 20,000 soldiers and police officers on the field against a population of about 2,000 aboriginals.
During a battle, Sakuma Samata was seriously injured but in the second half of August 1914, the Japanese declared victory over the Truku and on August 28, the Governor-General of Taiwan declared the end of the war.

Consequences
After the war, the Governor-General of Taiwan conducted the restoration of damaged bridges, roads, and local police posts. The weapons owned by the aboriginals were confiscated and the escaped aboriginal tribal people were pacified. New subdivisions under Hualien Administrative Division were set up in Xincheng and inner-Taroko areas. Further police forces were introduced into remote mountain areas taking thorough and full control of the aboriginal neighborhoods. A lot of Truku people were moved in groups to the plains and were scattered into many different locations. Some of them were moved to Chinese Han neighborhoods as well. By taking this action, the Japanese hoped to undermine the Truku's social structure, traditional culture and beliefs. Children educational places were introduced in every police administrative areas in order to promote Japanese culture.

Traditional tribal lifestyles and means of self-sustenance of Truku people such as hunting and local farming were also discouraged, pushing for the development of fixed-farming agriculture such as silk, ramie, and tobacco.

See also
 History of Taiwan

External links

References 

Rebellions in Asia
Taiwan under Japanese rule
1914 in Japan
1914 in Taiwan
Combat incidents
Taiwanese aboriginal culture and history
Violence against indigenous peoples
Seediq people
Truku people
October 1914 events
November 1914 events
December 1914 events
Conflicts in 1914
Military history of Taiwan
Military history of Japan